Frühling Vesta Rijsdijk is a Dutch behavior geneticist who is professor in Statistical and Behavioral Genetics at the Social, Genetic and Developmental Psychiatry Centre in the Institute of Psychiatry, Psychology and Neuroscience, a school of King's College London. She received her PhD in behavior genetics from the Vrije Universiteit Amsterdam. She has developed structural equation modeling for use in behavioral genetic studies of twins and families. She received an HEA Senior Fellowship from King's in January 2019.

References

External links
Faculty page

Living people
Dutch geneticists
Behavior geneticists
Statistical geneticists
Academics of King's College London
Women geneticists
Dutch women scientists
Vrije Universiteit Amsterdam alumni
Year of birth missing (living people)